Jonny Hill (born 1940) is an Austrian singer. He is best known for the songs “Ruf Teddybär eins vier” , “Der alte Mann” and “30 Tonnen Kerosin”.

Discography 
Albums:
 Eine Reise um die Welt 1969
 Unsere Heimat ist der Ozean 1971
 Weit, weit, weit ist es nach Lüdenscheid 1975
 Auf großer Fahrt 1976 (mit Käpt'n Ross und dem Hummel-Hummel-Orchester)
 Weihnachten mit Dir 1976
 Soweit die Füße tragen 1979
 Die bekanntesten 24 Country Hits in deutsch 1979
 Ein Mann und das Meer 1980
 Die schönsten deutschen Volkslieder im Country-Sound 1981
 Ich fahr' meine Tour
 Country Songs 1983
 Westwärts 1987
 Hallo Teddybär 1987
 Zorn und Zärtlichkeit 1988
 Ohne Grenzen 1990
 Live In Concert
 Ich bin für die Liebe 1991
 König der Landstraße 1991
 Dieser Weg führt nach Haus 1992
 Truck Gold 1996
 Meine Liebe lebt 1993
 Country Songs 1994
 Meilensteine 1994
 Süßer die Glocken nie klingen (after "Süßer die Glocken nie klingen") 1995
 Mitten im Leben 1996
 Nie wieder allein 1996
 Lass mich sein wie ich bin 1997
 Cowboy der Landstraße 1998
 Wölfe und Schafe 1999
 Auf großer Fahrt 2000
 Bis ans Ende der Welt 2002
 Herzlichst 2003
 Ich hab noch viele Träume 2003
 Gala der Gefühle 2004 (Duett-CD mit Linda Feller)
 Lichter auf den Hügeln 2006
 Unvergessene Hits 2009
 Jonny Hill singt .. die schönsten Lieder von Freddy Quinn 2011
 In Nashville 2012.
 Das Beste - 30 Jahre 2011
 Bitte treten Sie zurück 2014

References

Living people
1940 births